The Devil's Holiday (French:Les vacances du diable) is a 1931 American-French drama film directed by Alberto Cavalcanti and starring Marcelle Chantal, Thomy Bourdelle and Jacques Varennes. It is the French-language version of The Devil's Holiday (1930). It was made at the Joinville Studios in Paris by the French subsidiary of Paramount Pictures which invested heavily in multi-language versions during the early years of sound.

Cast
 Marcelle Chantal as Betty Williams  
 Thomy Bourdelle as Mark Stone  
 Jacques Varennes as Charlie Thorne  
 Robert Hommet as Allan Stone  
 Maurice Schutz as David Stone  
 Jeanne Fusier-Gir as La standardiste  
 Pierre Richard-Willm as Dr. Reynolds  
 Louis Kerly as Kent Carr  
 Lucien Callamand as Hammond  
 Raymond Leboursier as Monk McConnell 
 Rachel Launay as Mary  
 Charlotte Martens as Anna  
 Jeanne Frédérique

References

Bibliography 
 Alan Gevinson. Within Our Gates: Ethnicity in American Feature Films, 1911-1960. University of California Press, 1997.

External links 
 

1931 films
1931 drama films
American drama films
French drama films
1930s French-language films
Films directed by Alberto Cavalcanti
Films shot at Joinville Studios
Paramount Pictures films
French multilingual films
French black-and-white films
American black-and-white films
1931 multilingual films
1930s American films
1930s French films